Gunbower is a town in northern Victoria, Australia.

Gunbower Post Office opened on 8 March 1876.

Gunbower has a horse racing club, the Gunbower Racing Club, which holds the Gunbower Cup meeting in October (the only meeting for the year).

References

Towns in Victoria (Australia)